Kuika is a small town in Achham District in the Seti Zone of western Nepal. At the time of the 1991 Nepal census, the town had a population of 3448 living in 667 houses. At the time of the 2001 Nepal census, the population was 3881, of which 36% was literate.

References

Populated places in Achham District
Village development committees in Achham District